Gekko is a genus of Southeast Asian geckos, commonly known as true geckos or calling geckos, in the family Gekkonidae. Although species such as Gekko gecko (tokay gecko) are very widespread and common, some species in the same genus have a very small range and are considered rare or endangered.

Species
The following 86 species are recognized as being valid.

Nota bene: A binomial authority in parentheses indicates that the species was originally described in a genus other than Gekko.

References

External links

 
 
 
 
 Gekko at Index to Organism Names
 Nomenclator Zoologicus

 
Lizard genera
Taxa named by Josephus Nicolaus Laurenti